Twin Oaks is an unincorporated community and census-designated place (CDP) in Delaware County, Oklahoma, United States. The population was 198 at the 2010 census. A tornado hit the town on March 12, 2006, destroying 36 homes and damaging 31 others. 8 people were injured.

Geography
Twin Oaks is located in southern Delaware County at  (36.197822, -94.828672). It is bordered to the northeast by the town of Kansas.

Demographics

As of the census of 2000, there were 186 people, 63 households, and 49 families residing in the CDP. The population density was 77.8 people per square mile (30.0/km2). There were 65 housing units at an average density of 27.2/sq mi (10.5/km2). The racial makeup of the CDP was 35.48% White, 59.68% Native American, 0.54% from other races, and 4.30% from two or more races. Hispanic or Latino of any race were 1.61% of the population.

There were 63 households, out of which 41.3% had children under the age of 18 living with them, 61.9% were married couples living together, 11.1% had a female householder with no husband present, and 22.2% were non-families. 22.2% of all households were made up of individuals, and 7.9% had someone living alone who was 65 years of age or older. The average household size was 2.95 and the average family size was 3.45.

In the CDP, the population was spread out, with 29.6% under the age of 18, 10.8% from 18 to 24, 33.3% from 25 to 44, 18.3% from 45 to 64, and 8.1% who were 65 years of age or older. The median age was 30 years. For every 100 females, there were 102.2 males. For every 100 females age 18 and over, there were 95.5 males.

The median income for a household in the CDP was $26,818, and the median income for a family was $28,750. Males had a median income of $25,167 versus $16,607 for females. The per capita income for the CDP was $8,334. About 29.2% of families and 39.1% of the population were below the poverty line, including 55.0% of those under the age of eighteen and none of those 65 or over.

References

Census-designated places in Delaware County, Oklahoma
Census-designated places in Oklahoma